McLain Joseph Schneider (born March 27, 1979) is an American attorney and politician who has served as the United States attorney for the District of North Dakota since December 2022. He previously represented the 42nd district in the North Dakota Senate from 2009 until his reelection defeat in 2016. A member of the North Dakota Democratic-NPL Party, he served as the Senate Minority Leader from 2013 until the end of his Senate tenure. He was the Democratic-NPL endorsed candidate for the 2018 United States House of Representatives election in North Dakota.

Early life and education
Schneider was born and raised in Fargo, North Dakota.

Schneider comes from a political family. His father, Mark, was the Democratic-NPL Party chairman in 2009; his mother, Mary, serves as a North Dakota State Representative from the 21st district; his uncle, John Schneider, is a former North Dakota state representative; and he campaigned for other Democratic state senators as a child.

Schneider graduated from Fargo South High School in 1998. In 2002, he received a degree in history from the University of North Dakota. Schneider was a starting center on UND's 2001 national championship football team and served as team captain his senior season. He graduated from Georgetown University with his Juris Doctor in 2008.

North Dakota Senate
In 2008, Schneider was first elected to the North Dakota Senate from the 42nd district, which includes parts of northern Grand Forks and the University of North Dakota campus. He was reelected in 2012, and ran again in 2016, but lost to Republican Curt Kreun.

In the 2011 legislative session, he was elected to serve as Assistant Minority Leader of the North Dakota Senate, before serving as Minority Leader in the 2013 and 2015 legislative sessions.

Schneider's committee assignments during his tenure included the Standing Judiciary, Natural Resources, and Industry, Business, and Labor committees. He also served on the Interim Judiciary Committee, Budget Section Committee, Economic Impact Committee, Legislative Management Committee, and the Legislative Procedure and Arrangements Committee.

2018 congressional election

On March 6, 2018, Schneider announced his candidacy for that year's U.S. House of Representatives election for North Dakota's at-large congressional district. Schneider won the endorsement of the North Dakota Democratic-NPL Party at their 2018 state convention on March 17, 2018, defeating former State Representative Ben W. Hanson and State Senator John Grabinger. Schneider was defeated in the general election by Republican Kelly Armstrong, who won 60% of the vote to Schneider's 36%.

U.S. attorney 

On September 15, 2022, President Joe Biden announced his intent to nominate Schneider to be the United States attorney for the District of North Dakota. The same day, his nomination was sent to the United States Senate.

On November 17, 2022, Schneider's nomination was reported of committee by a voice vote, with Senators Mike Lee, Josh Hawley, and Marsha Blackburn voting "no" on record. On December 6, 2022, his nomination was confirmed in the Senate by voice vote. He was sworn in on December 12, 2022.

Electoral history

References

External links
 Biography at U.S. Department of Justice
 Biography at the North Dakota Legislature
 
 

1979 births
Living people
21st-century American politicians
American football offensive linemen
Candidates in the 2018 United States elections
Georgetown University Law Center alumni
North Dakota lawyers
Democratic Party North Dakota state senators
North Dakota Fighting Hawks football players
Players of American football from North Dakota
Politicians from Fargo, North Dakota
Sportspeople from Fargo, North Dakota
United States Attorneys for the District of North Dakota